"Love Is Forever"  is the final track from Love Zone, the 1986 album by Billy Ocean.  The song was written by Ocean along with Barry Eastmond and Wayne Braithwaite and was the last of his three number ones on the Adult Contemporary chart.  "Love Is Forever" spent three weeks at number one and peaked at number 16 on the Billboard Hot 100.  "Love Is Forever" also peaked at number 10 on the soul chart.

Chart performance

References

1986 singles
Billy Ocean songs
Songs written by Billy Ocean
Songs written by Barry Eastmond
Contemporary R&B ballads
1980s ballads
Jive Records singles